The Ministry of Justice provides the administrative framework for the judges and prosecutors such as their professional training and salary and duty allowances. Additionally, with regard to prosecutors, the Minister of Justice is the chief of the prosecution and has the right to issue an injunction (order) to the prosecutions of all level of courts. The General Departments of Prosecutor and Criminal Affairs of the Ministry of Justice is the staff to the Minister of Justice on any related issues.

List of ministers (1966–present) 

 Ponn Vongs Vaddey (1966)
 Yem Sambaur (1967)
 Tep Hun (1967–1969)
 Yem Sambaur (1970–1972)
 Chhan Sokhom (1973)
 Ly Khvan Pan (1974–1975)
 Norodom Phurissara (1975–1976)
 Chem Snguon (1993–1998)
 Uk Vithun (1999–2001)
 Neav Sithong (2002-2017)
 Ang Vong Vattana (2017–2020)
 Koeut Rith (2020–present)

See also 

 Justice ministry
 Politics of Cambodia

References 

Justice ministries
Government ministries of Cambodia
`